Hasan Kafi Pruščak (November/December 1544 – 9 October 1615) was a Bosnian Hanafi scholar, philosopher, historian, writer, poet, Maturidi theologian, philologist and "qadi" (judge) who studied in Bosnia and Istanbul. 

He is considered to be the most significant figure of the area's scientific, cultural and intellectual life in the 16th and early 17th centuries, as well as one of the most important Bosniak thinkers.

Birth 
He was born in 1544 in Prusac, studied in Istanbul, and from 1583 he was a judge of Prusac.

Works 
Basis of Wisdom on the Organization of the World is the most significant of his seventeen works. In this work, Pruščak deals with the key issues of the Ottoman Empire at the time and the study was meant to: "help the rulers, guide the viziers, be a role-model for the wise and support for the poor."

Background 
Pruščak hailed from the village Prusac near the Bosnian town of Donji Vakuf. He attended elementary school in Prusac before relocating to Istanbul where he studied for nine years. He returned to his hometown in 1575.

He went on the Hajj to Mecca in 1591.

See also 
 Mustafa Ejubović
 Damat Ibrahim Pasha
 Sokollu Mehmed Pasha
 List of Hanafis
 List of Muslim theologians
 List of Ash'aris and Maturidis

References

External links 
 Jedna je od najstarijih džamija. Znate li kada je sagrađena Hasan Kjafijina džamija u Pruscu? 

Hanafis
Maturidis
16th-century Muslim theologians
People from Donji Vakuf
Bosnian Sunni Muslim scholars of Islam
16th-century historians from the Ottoman Empire
Bosnia and Herzegovina poets
Bosniak writers
Sociologists from the Ottoman Empire
People from the Ottoman Empire of Bosnian descent
16th-century Bosnian people
17th-century Bosnian people
1544 births
1615 deaths
17th-century Muslim theologians